Aldana is a town and municipality in the Nariño Department, Colombia.

Climate
Aldana has a cold subtropical highland climate (Köppen Cfb) with moderate rainfall year-round.

References

Municipalities of Nariño Department